The Lotus 2-Eleven is a car produced by British car manufacturer Lotus. It is based on the Lotus Exige S, and thus has the same Toyota 2ZZ-GE with VVTL-i, Eaton M62 Roots-type supercharger and intercooled inline-four engine. Intended as a track day car, it costs £39,995 though for an additional £1,100 Lotus will make the car fully road legal.

References

External links 

Top Gear’s guide to 2-Eleven

2-Eleven
2010s cars
Cars introduced in 2007